Laura Jane Silverman (born June 10, 1966) is an American actress and the older sister of actress and comedian Sarah Silverman. She acted in Sarah Silverman: Jesus Is Magic and The Sarah Silverman Program portraying a fictionalized version of herself. She also stars as Jane Benson on The Comeback with Lisa Kudrow and voiced Laura, the sarcastic receptionist on the animated comedy television series Dr. Katz, Professional Therapist. Her dramatic roles include guest appearances in House and Nurse Jackie.

Silverman was born to Beth Ann O'Hara and Donald Silverman. Her parents divorced and each remarried (to John O'Hara and Janice, respectively). She has three sisters: screenwriter Jodyne, comedian Sarah Silverman, and Rabbi Susan Silverman. Her brother Jeffrey Michael died when he was 3 months old. Their family is Jewish.

Silverman graduated from Tufts University.

Selected acting roles

References

External links
 

1966 births
20th-century American actresses
21st-century American actresses
Actors from Manchester, New Hampshire
American film actresses
American television actresses
American television writers
American voice actresses
Actresses from New Hampshire
Jewish American actresses
Jewish American female comedians
Living people
Tufts University alumni
American women television writers
Screenwriters from New Hampshire
People from Bedford, New Hampshire
21st-century American Jews